Micromyrtus redita is a plant species of the family Myrtaceae endemic to Western Australia.

The densely-branched shrub is found on plains, hills and ridges in a few small areas in the Wheatbelt region of Western Australia between Wongan Hills and Mukinbudin.

References

redita
Flora of Western Australia
Plants described in 2006
Taxa named by Barbara Lynette Rye